Hudgins is a surname. Notable people with the surname include:

Andrew Hudgins (born 1951), American poet
Cathy Hudgins (born 1944), American politician
David Hudgins (born 1965), American television writer and producer
Edward W. Hudgins (1882–1958), American judge
John Hudgins (born 1981), American baseball player
Terrell Hudgins (born 1987), American football player
Trevor Hudgins (born 1999), American basketball player
Zack Hudgins (born 1968), American politician